Leonard Wester (born January 3, 1993) is a former American football offensive tackle. He played Division II college football at Missouri Western.

Professional career

Tampa Bay Buccaneers
On April 30, 2016, Wester signed with the Tampa Bay Buccaneers after going undrafted in the 2016 NFL Draft.

Jacksonville Jaguars
On April 4, 2019, Wester signed with the Jacksonville Jaguars. He was waived/injured during final roster cuts on August 31, 2019 and reverted to the team's injured reserve list the next day. He was waived from injured reserve with an injury settlement on September 6.

San Francisco 49ers
On January 14, 2020, Wester signed a reserve/future contract with the San Francisco 49ers. He was released on July 30, 2020.

References

Living people
1993 births
Players of American football from Iowa
People from Mount Pleasant, Iowa
American football offensive tackles
Missouri Western Griffons football players
Tampa Bay Buccaneers players
Jacksonville Jaguars players
San Francisco 49ers players